WSWB (channel 38) is a television station licensed to Scranton, Pennsylvania, United States, serving as the CW affiliate for Northeastern Pennsylvania. It is owned by MPS Media, which maintains a local marketing agreement (LMA) with New Age Media, owner of Hazleton-licensed Fox affiliate and company flagship WOLF-TV (channel 56) and Williamsport-licensed MyNetworkTV affiliate WQMY (channel 53), for the provision of certain services. All three stations, in turn, are operated under a master service agreement by the Sinclair Broadcast Group. The stations share studios on PA 315 in the Fox Hill section of Plains Township; WSWB's transmitter is located on Bald Mountain, northwest of Scranton and I-476. However, newscasts have originated from the facilities of sister station and CBS affiliate WSBT-TV in South Bend, Indiana since January 2017.

Although WSWB transmits a digital signal of its own, reception is spotty in much of the southern portion of the market since its transmitter is located farther north than the market's other stations. Therefore, the station is simulcast in standard definition on WOLF-TV's second digital subchannel (56.2) from its transmitter on Penobscot Knob near Mountain Top. WSWB also operates a digital replacement translator on UHF channel 36 that is licensed to Waymart with a transmitter in Forest City. It exists because wind turbines run by NextEra Energy Resources at the Waymart Wind Farm interfere with the transmission of full-power television signals.

In addition to its own digital signal, WSWB is simulcast in standard definition on WQMY's third digital subchannel (UHF channel 29.5 or virtual channel 53.3 via PSIP) from a transmitter on Bald Eagle Mountain.

History

Early history
The station first signed-on June 3, 1985, with the calls WOLF-TV, locally owned by Scranton TV Partners. It was the first independent outlet in Northeastern Pennsylvania, and the market's first new commercial station in 32 years. A few days later, it added WWLF-TV in Hazleton as a full-time satellite for the southern portion of the market. After a little more than a year as an Independent, WOLF-TV became a charter affiliate of Fox on October 9, 1986. Two years later, WILF-TV in Williamsport was launched as a second full-time satellite to improve coverage in the western and northern parts of the market, including portions of the Pennsylvania side of the adjacent Binghamton and Elmira markets (which would not receive local Fox affiliates until April 1996 and mid-1997, respectively).

In 1993, Scranton TV Partners merged with Pegasus Communications. The latter immediately sought permission to move either the analog UHF channel 38 or channel 56 transmitters to the Northeastern Pennsylvania tower farm on Penobscot Knob. Ultimately, Pegasus was allowed to move the WWLF transmitter.  On November 1, 1998, Pegasus activated the new analog channel 56 transmitter and moved the WOLF-TV call letters there. Meanwhile, channel 38 became a WB affiliate under new calls WSWB, succeeding WYLN-LP as the network's over the air affiliate in the area. This call sign was chosen because they could have meant "Scranton's WB" for its affiliation, or the area it serves, Scranton–Wilkes-Barre. Originally, channel 38 was given the WSWB calls in 1981, but they were changed to WOLF-TV before the station went on-the-air in 1985. WILF in Williamsport remained as a full-time satellite.

At the time of the switch, WSWB also picked up a secondary affiliation with UPN. It showed select programming from the network on Saturday nights (since there were no shows from The WB) without the branding. From 2003 to 2006, the station aired America's Next Top Model at 8:00 p.m., followed at 9:00 p.m. by WWE Friday Night SmackDown. Whenever Top Model was in repeats, WSWB would air Veronica Mars instead. All UPN programming in pattern was also available on cable in the area via WWOR-TV (which was receivable over-the-air in extreme eastern portions of the market, as well as in Pike County, which is considered part of the New York City DMA), WPSG from Philadelphia, and WLYH-TV from Harrisburg.

As a CW affiliate
On January 24, 2006, the respective parent companies of UPN and The WB, CBS Corporation and the Warner Bros. Entertainment division of Time Warner, announced that they would dissolve the two networks to create The CW Television Network, a joint venture between the two media companies that initially featured programs from its two predecessor networks as well as new series specifically produced for The CW. Subsequently, on February 22, 2006, News Corporation announced the launch of MyNetworkTV, a network operated by Fox Television Stations and its syndication division Twentieth Television that was created to primarily to provide network programming to UPN and WB stations that The CW decided against affiliating based on their local viewership standing in comparison to the outlet that The CW ultimately chose as its charter outlets, giving these stations another option besides converting to a general entertainment independent format.

On May 1, 2006, in an announcement by the network, WSWB was named as The CW's Scranton/Wilkes-Barre affiliate; it was the obvious choice since it already carried both WB and UPN programming. At the same time, it was announced that WILF would sever the electronic umbilical cord with WSWB and become the area's charter MyNetworkTV affiliate. Since WILF's signal was more or less unviewable in the Scranton/Wilkes-Barre area, it was also announced that it would be added to a new third digital subchannel of WOLF-TV. WILF changed its call letters to the current WQMY on July 7 to reflect the upcoming affiliation change. WQMY became a charter affiliate of MyNetworkTV when that network launched on September 5, at which time, the station ceased operating as a full-time WSWB satellite and introduced a separate programming lineup and branding. WSWB became a CW charter affiliate when that network launched two weeks later on September 18.

On September 25, 2013, New Age Media announced that it would sell most of its stations, including WOLF-TV and WQMY, to the Sinclair Broadcast Group. Concurrently, MPS Media planned to sell WSWB to Cunningham Broadcasting; the station would continue to be operated by WOLF-TV. On October 31, 2014, MPS Media requested the dismissal of its application to sell WSWB; the next day, Sinclair purchased the non-license assets of the stations it planned to buy from New Age Media and began operating them through a master service agreement.

On May 8, 2017, Sinclair entered into an agreement to acquire Chicago-based Tribune Media – which, through a shared services agreement with owner Dreamcatcher Broadcasting, has operated WNEP-TV since December 2013 – for $3.9 billion, plus the assumption of $2.7 billion in debt held by Tribune. The complicated SSA relationships that Sinclair has in the Scranton–Wilkes–Barre market with WOLF, WSWB and WQMY – the former two of which are currently the only legal television duopoly in the market – created an ownership entanglement, as WNEP and WOLF rank among the market's four highest-rated stations, and the market has too few independently owned full-power stations to permit a second legal duopoly in any event. (Sinclair CEO Christopher Ripley cited Scranton–Wilkes–Barre as one of three markets, out of fourteen where ownership conflicts exist between the two groups, where the proposed acquisition would likely result in divestitures). To alleviate some of the regulatory issues that the deal incurred by selling certain stations to both independent and affiliated third-party companies, on April 24, 2018, Sinclair announced that it would sell the non-license assets of WOLF-TV, WQMY, and WSWB and the full assets of eight other stations – Sinclair-operated KOKH-TV in Oklahoma City, WRLH-TV in Richmond, KDSM-TV in Des Moines and WXLV-TV in Greensboro/Winston-Salem/High Point, and Tribune-owned WPMT in Harrisburg and WXMI in Grand Rapids – to Standard Media Group (an independent broadcast holding company formed by private equity firm Standard General to assume ownership of and absolve ownership conflicts involving the aforementioned stations) for $441.1 million. Sinclair concurrently exercised its option to buy WOLF-TV and WQMY to allow Standard Media Group – the latter of which, for regulatory purposes, will continue to be licensed as a satellite of WOLF-TV – to acquire the stations outright; Standard will concurrently acquire the WOLF-TV license, which is permitted under Federal Communications Commission (FCC) ownership regulations as WSWB is not ranked as one of the top-four stations in the market.

Three weeks after the FCC's July 18 vote to have the deal reviewed by an administrative law judge amid "serious concerns" about Sinclair's forthrightness in its applications to sell certain conflict properties, on August 9, 2018, Tribune announced it would terminate the Sinclair deal, intending to seek other M&A opportunities. Tribune also filed a breach of contract lawsuit in the Delaware Chancery Court, alleging that Sinclair engaged in protracted negotiations with the FCC and the DOJ over regulatory issues, refused to sell stations in markets where it already had properties, and proposed divestitures to parties with ties to Sinclair executive chair David D. Smith that were rejected or highly subject to rejection to maintain control over stations it was required to sell. The termination of the Sinclair sale agreement places uncertainty for the future of Standard Media's purchases of WOLF/WQMY/WSWB and the other four Tribune- and Sinclair-operated stations included in that deal, which were predicated on the closure of the Sinclair–Tribune merger.

On July 28, 2021, the FCC issued a Forfeiture Order stemming from a lawsuit against MPS Media. The lawsuit, filed by AT&T, alleged that MPS Media failed to negotiate for retransmission consent in good faith for the stations. Owners of other Sinclair-managed stations, such as Deerfield Media, were also named in the lawsuit. MPS was ordered to pay a fine of $512,288.

Newscasts
Fox required most of its affiliates to begin offering local news in 1990 in order to help the fledgling network. To satisfy this, what was then WOLF-TV entered into a news share agreement with ABC affiliate WNEP-TV in 1991. This resulted in a nightly prime time newscast known as Newswatch 16 at 10 on Fox 38. It originated from WNEP's facilities on Montage Mountain Road in Moosic. When the Fox affiliation moved to the new WOLF-TV (previously WWLF), the newscasts did as well. The show then became known as Fox 56 News at 10 with a secondary title of Newswatch 16 at 10 on Fox 56. In November 2009, it was announced that WNEP would move its production of the news at 10 to a second digital subchannel called "WNEP 2" that recently gained Retro Television Network (RTV) affiliation.

That happened December 31, 2009 after which WOLF-TV and NBC affiliate WBRE-TV entered into an agreement. Taking over production of nightly prime time newscasts on WOLF-TV starting New Year's Day 2010, WBRE expanded the show to an hour each night and changed the title to Fox 56 News First at 10. It now originates from a secondary set at WBRE's studios on South Franklin Street in Downtown Wilkes-Barre. As was the case with the WNEP-produced broadcasts, if there are network obligations or overruns of Fox programming that prevent WOLF-TV from showing the current program, it is aired on WSWB.

Technical information

Subchannels
The station's digital signal is multiplexed:

WSWB launched the MeTV network on May 3, 2011, on sub channel 38.2.

WSWB was among the launch group of Comet affiliates. The network launched October 31, 2015.

Translator

Analog-to-digital conversion
WSWB shut down its analog signal, over UHF channel 38, on February 17, 2009, the original target date in which full-power television stations in the United States were to transition from analog to digital broadcasts under federal mandate (which was later pushed back to June 12, 2009). The station's digital signal remained on its pre-transition UHF channel 31. Through the use of PSIP, digital television receivers display the station's virtual channel as its former UHF analog channel 38.

References

External links
Official website

The CW affiliates
MeTV affiliates
Comet (TV network) affiliates
Stadium (sports network) affiliates
Television channels and stations established in 1985
1985 establishments in Pennsylvania
SWB
Sinclair Broadcast Group
Low-power television stations in the United States